Grand Prix motorcycle racing is the premier class of motorcycle road racing events held on road circuits sanctioned by the Fédération Internationale de Motocyclisme (FIM). Independent motorcycle racing events have been held since the start of the twentieth century and large national events were often given the title Grand Prix. The foundation of the Fédération Internationale de Motocyclisme as the international governing body for motorcycle sport in 1949 provided the opportunity to coordinate rules and regulations in order that selected events could count towards official World Championships. It is the oldest established motorsport world championship.

Grand Prix motorcycles are purpose-built racing machines that are unavailable for purchase by the general public and unable to be ridden legally on public roads. This contrasts with the various production-based categories of racing, such as the Superbike World Championship and the Isle of Man TT Races that feature modified versions of road-going motorcycles available to the public. The current top division is known as MotoGP since  when the four-stroke era began. Prior to that, the largest class was 500cc, both of which form a historical continuum as the official World Championship, although all classes have official status.

The championship is currently divided into four classes: the eponymous MotoGP, Moto2, Moto3 and MotoE. The first three classes use four-stroke engines, while the MotoE class (new in 2019) uses electric motorcycles. 

The most successful rider in Grand Prix history is Giacomo Agostini with 15 titles and 122 race wins. In the top-flight series, Agostini holds the title record with eight, followed by Valentino Rossi with seven and active rider Marc Márquez with six. As of 2020, Rossi holds the record for most top-flight race wins with 89.

History

An FIM Road Racing World Championship Grand Prix was first organized by the Fédération Internationale de Motocyclisme in 1949. The commercial rights are now owned by Dorna Sports, with the FIM remaining as the sport sanctioning body. Teams are represented by the International Road Racing Teams Association (IRTA) and manufacturers by the Motorcycle Sport Manufacturers Association (MSMA). Rules and changes to regulations are decided between the four entities, with Dorna casting a tie-breaking vote. In cases of technical modifications, the MSMA can unilaterally enact or veto changes by unanimous vote among its members. These four entities compose the Grand Prix Commission.

There have traditionally been several races at each event for various classes of motorcycles, based on engine size, and one class for sidecars. Classes for 50 cc, 80 cc, 125 cc, 250 cc, 350 cc, 500 cc, and 750 cc solo machines have existed at some time, and 350 cc and 500 cc sidecars. Up through the 1950s and most of the 1960s, four-stroke engines dominated all classes.  In the 1960s, due to advances in engine design and technology, two-stroke engines began to take root in the smaller classes.

In 1969, the FIM—citing high development costs  for non-works teams due to rules which allowed a multiplicity of cylinders (meaning smaller pistons, producing higher revs) and a multiplicity of gears (giving narrower power bands, affording higher states of tune)—brought in new rules restricting all classes to six gears and most to two cylinders (four cylinders in the case of the 350 cc and 500 cc classes). This led to a mass walk-out of the sport by the previously highly successful Honda, Suzuki and Yamaha manufacturer teams, skewing the results tables for the next several years, with MV Agusta effectively the only works team left in the sport until Yamaha (1973) and Suzuki (1974) returned with new two-stroke designs. By this time, two-strokes completely eclipsed the four-strokes in all classes. In 1979, Honda, on its return to GP racing, made an attempt to return the four-stroke to the top class with the NR500, but this project failed, and, in 1983, even Honda was winning with a two-stroke 500.

Previously, the championship featured a 50cc class from 1962 to 1983, later changed to an 80cc class from 1984 to 1989. The class was dropped for the 1990 season, after being dominated primarily by Spanish and Italian makes. It also featured a 350cc class from 1949 to 1982, and a 750 cc class from 1977 to 1979. Sidecars were dropped from world championship events in the 1990s (see Sidecar World Championship).

From the mid-1970s through to 2001, the top class of GP racing allowed 500 cc displacement with a maximum of four cylinders, regardless of whether the engine was a two-stroke or four-stroke. This is unlike TT Formula or motocross, where two and four strokes had different engine size limits in the same class to provide similar performance. Consequently, all machines were two-strokes, since they produce power with every rotation of the crank, whereas four-stroke engines produce power only every second rotation. Some two- and three-cylinder two-stroke 500s were seen, but though they had a minimum-weight advantage under the rules, typically attained higher corner speed and could qualify well, they lacked the power of the four-cylinder machines.

In 2002, rule changes were introduced to facilitate the phasing out of the 500 cc two-strokes. The premier class was rebranded MotoGP, as manufacturers were to choose between running two-stroke engines up to 500 cc or four-strokes up to 990 cc or less. Manufacturers were also permitted to employ their choice of engine configuration. Despite the increased costs of the new four-stroke engines, they were soon able to dominate their two-stroke rivals. As a result, by 2003 no two-stroke machines remained in the MotoGP field. The 125 cc and 250 cc classes still consisted exclusively of two-stroke machines.

In 2007, the MotoGP class had its maximum engine displacement capacity reduced to 800 cc for a minimum of five years. As a result of the 2008–2009 financial crisis, MotoGP underwent changes in an effort to cut costs. Among them are reducing Friday practice sessions and testing sessions, extending the lifespan of engines, switching to a single tyre manufacturer, and banning qualifying tyres, active suspension, launch control and ceramic composite brakes. For the 2010 season, carbon brake discs were banned.

For the 2012 season, the MotoGP engine capacity was increased again to 1,000 cc. It also saw the introduction of Claiming Rule Teams (CRT), which were given more engines per season and larger fuel tanks than factory teams, but were subject to a factory team buying ("claiming") their rival's powertrain for a fixed price. The sport's governing body received applications from sixteen new teams looking to join the MotoGP class. For the 2014 season, the CRT subclass was rebranded Open, as the claiming rule was removed. Also, all entries adopted a standard engine control unit, with factory teams being allowed to run any software, and Open entries using a standard software. For the 2016 season, the Open subclass was dropped, and factory entries switched to a standard engine control unit software.

In 2010, the 250cc two-stroke class was replaced by the new Moto2 600 cc four-stroke class. In 2012, the 125cc two-stroke class was replaced by the Moto3 250cc four-stroke class with a weight limit of 65 kg with fuel. For the 2019 season Moto2 introduced the 3-cylinder, 765cc Triumph production engine, while Moto3 and MotoGP still use prototype engines.

Chronology

Pre-MotoGP era
 1949: Start of the world championship in Grand Prix motorcycle racing for five separate categories, 125cc, 250cc, 350cc, 500cc and sidecars. Harold Daniell wins the first ever 500 cc Grand Prix race held at the Isle of Man TT.
 1951: Sidecars reduced in engine capacity from 600 cc to 500 cc
 1957: Gilera, Mondial and Moto Guzzi withdraw at the end of the season citing increasing costs. Bob McIntyre wins the longest ever Grand Prix race of 301.84 miles, held over 8 laps of the Isle of Man.
 1958: MV Agusta win the constructors' and riders' championships in all four solo classes, a feat the team repeat in 1959 and 1960.
 1959: Honda enters the Isle of Man TT for the first time.
 1961: The 1961 Argentine Grand Prix is the first world championship race held outside of Europe. 
 1963: The 1963 Japanese Grand Prix is the first world championship race held in Asia.
 1964: The 1964 United States Grand Prix is the first world championship race held in North America.
 1966: Honda wins the constructors' championship in all five solo classes. Jim Redman wins Honda's first ever 500 cc Grand Prix at Hockenheim, also the first win for a Japanese factory in the premier class.
 1967: Final year of unrestricted numbers of cylinders and gears. Honda withdraws in protest.
 1968: Giacomo Agostini (MV Agusta) wins both the 350 cc and 500 cc titles.
 1969: Godfrey Nash riding a Norton Manx becomes the last rider to win a 500 cc Grand Prix riding a single-cylinder machine.
 1971: Jack Findlay rides a Suzuki TR500 to the first ever win in the 500 cc class for a two-stroke machine.
 1972: as 1968. The death of Gilberto Parlotti at the Isle of Man TT causes multiple world champion Giacomo Agostini and other riders to boycott the next four events on grounds of safety.
 1972: Last year of 500 cc sidecars.
 1972: Giacomo Agostini wins his seventh consecutive 500cc championship, all with MV Agusta.
 1973: Deaths of Jarno Saarinen and Renzo Pasolini at the Italian round at Monza and cancelled.
 1974: The Suzuki RG500 is the first square-four in the 500 cc class. The constructors' title is won by a Japanese brand and a two-stroke for the first time (Yamaha).
 1975: Giacomo Agostini (Yamaha) wins the 500 cc class, making Yamaha the first non European brand to the riders' championship in the premier class with two stroke engine.
 1976: Barry Sheene wins the first 500 cc championship for Suzuki. After the 1976 Isle of Man TT, the FIM gives in to the riders' boycott and removes the event from the Grand Prix calendar.
 1977: 750 FIM prize becomes a world championship for 750cc machines. Barry Sheene wins the 500 cc class. The British Grand Prix moves from the Isle of Man to the Silverstone Circuit on the British mainland.
 1978: Kenny Roberts (Yamaha) wins the 500 cc class, the first American to do so.
 1979: Last year of the 750 cc class.
 1980: Patrick Pons (Yamaha 500 cc) and Malcolm White (sidecar) are both killed at the Silverstone British GP.
 1981: Marco Lucchinelli wins the 500GP world title with his Suzuki RG500 Gamma.
 1982: Franco Uncini wins 500cc class world title riding a Suzuki RG500 Gamma.
 1982: Last year of 350 cc class.
 1983: Freddie Spencer (Honda) wins the 500 cc class. Spencer and Kenny Roberts win all 500cc races for the season between them.
 1984: Michelin introduces radial tyres in GPs.
 1984: 50 cc class replaced by 80 cc.
 1985: Freddie Spencer (Honda) wins both the 250cc and 500cc titles.
 1987: Push starts are eliminated.
 1987: Wayne Gardner (Honda) wins the 500 cc class, the first Australian to do so.
 1988: Wayne Rainey wins the first 500 cc race using carbon brakes, at the British GP.
 1988: Alfred Heck (passenger Andreas Räcke) is killed during free practice in the French Sidecar GP.
 1989: Iván Palazzese (Aprilia) is killed in 250 cc West German GP at Hockenheim.
 1989: Last year of 80 cc class.
 1990: 500 cc grid switches from five to four bikes per row.
 1992: Honda introduces the NSR500 with a big bang engine.
 1993: Shinichi Itoh and his fuel-injected NSR500 break the  barrier at the German GP at Hockenheim.
 1993: Nobuyuki Wakai (Suzuki) is killed during the practice session of the 250 cc GP in Spain.
 1993: Three-time 500cc champion and then title holder Wayne Rainey (Yamaha) is paralyzed following a crash at Misano.
 1994: Simon Prior, passenger of Yoshisada Kumagaya, on an LCR-ADM, is killed in a crash involving seven outfits in the Sidecar GP at Hockenheim.
 1998: the 500 cc class switches to unleaded fuel.
 1998: Mick Doohan wins his fifth consecutive 500cc title, all with Honda.
 1999: Àlex Crivillé (Honda) wins the 500cc class, the first Spaniard to do so.
 2000: Kenny Roberts Jr. (Suzuki) wins the 500cc class, he joins his father Kenny Roberts to claim the championship and thus making them the only father & son to have won the 500cc championship.
 2001: Valentino Rossi wins his first premier class title and becomes the final two-stroke champion in the premium series.

MotoGP era

2000s
 2002: MotoGP replaces the 500cc class; four-strokes are re-introduced and receive a displacement increase to 990cc. Two-strokes of 500cc capacity remain legal for independent teams for the transitional period.
 2003: Ducati makes its Grand Prix debut in the new four-stroke MotoGP class.
 2003: Daijiro Kato is killed during his home Japanese Grand Prix in the MotoGP class at Suzuka when he hits the barrier at 130R just before the final chicane.
 2003: The last start of a two-stroke bike in MotoGP occurs at the Czech Grand Prix.
 2004: MotoGP grid switches from four to three bikes per row while the 250cc and 125cc classes retain four bikes per row.
 2004: Makoto Tamada earns Bridgestone their first MotoGP victory at the Brazilian GP.
 2005: MotoGP adopts flag-to-flag rule, allowing riders to pit and switch to bikes fitted with wet-weather tyres and continue if rain begins to fall mid-race.
 2005: Valentino Rossi wins his fifth consecutive MotoGP title.
 2007: MotoGP engine capacity is restricted to 800cc four-strokes.
 2007: Ducati wins the riders' championship with Casey Stoner and also the constructors' title, becoming the first European brand to have done so in the premier class in 30 years. Stoner won 10 out of 17 races in the season.
 2008: MotoGP runs its first night race in Qatar.
 2008: Dunlop drops out of MotoGP.
 2009: Michelin drops out of MotoGP and Bridgestone becomes the sole tyre provider. 
 2009: Kawasaki ran a single bike as Hayate Racing Team after the factory team announced their withdrawal from the series.
 2009: Valentino Rossi wins his seventh and last MotoGP title at the age of 30

2010s
 2010: Moto2 replaces the 250cc class. All engines are built for Moto2 by Honda and are four-stroke 600cc (36.6 cu in) in-line four-cylinder based on the CBR600RR road bike, producing around 140 bhp as of 2015 (125 whp)
 2010: Moto2 rider Shoya Tomizawa is killed at Misano.
 2010: For the first time, Spain hosts four Grands Prix in a year.
 2010: 'Rookie rule' introduced, preventing any newcomer to the MotoGP championship from riding for a factory team, unless said manufacturer lacked a satellite team
 2010: Kawasaki announces its retirement due to negotiations with Dorna, stating that it will continue racing activities using mass-produced motorcycles as well as supporting general race-oriented consumers.
 2011: MotoGP rider Marco Simoncelli is killed at Sepang.
 2011: Suzuki suspend their MotoGP participation at the end of the season.
 2012: The new Moto3 250cc (15.2 cu in) four-stroke single-cylinder class replaces the 125cc two-stroke class.
 2012: MotoGP raises the maximum engine capacity to 1,000cc (61 cu in) and introduces claiming rule teams.
 2012: Aprilia rejoins the MotoGP class as a claiming rule team (CRT).
 2012: After ending a five-year Honda title drought the previous season, two-time world champion Casey Stoner retires from the sport at the age of 27, being replaced by teenager Marc Márquez at the team.
 2013: Knockout qualifying format is introduced.
 2013: The 'rookie rule' introduced for the 2010 season is rescinded.
 2013: Marc Márquez becomes the first rookie to win the championship in the MotoGP era, and the youngest ever premier class world champion.
 2014: Removal of the claiming rule teams and introduction of the Open Class category. Marc Márquez dominates the season by winning the first 10 races of the season. 
 2015: Suzuki returns to MotoGP as a constructor after a four-year hiatus.
 2015: Aprilia returns with a full factory team, run by Gresini Racing.
 2015: Yamaha's Jorge Lorenzo comes from seven points adrift to defeat team colleague Valentino Rossi to win his third and final MotoGP title by five points. This was after Rossi received a heavy grid penalty for the final round after having been adjudged to taking Marc Márquez out at the penultimate round.
 2016: Michelin returns as tyre supplier after Bridgestone's withdrawal.
 2016: Luis Salom dies during Moto2 practice at the Catalan Grand Prix after a high-speed impact with his own stricken bike.
 2017: KTM joins the premier class with a factory-supported team for the first time.
 2018: For the first time in MotoGP, certain satellite teams like Pramac Ducati and LCR Honda gain access to up-to-date factory bikes.
 2019: Triumph Motorcycles replace Honda as sole Moto2 engine supplier. The new engines are 765cc (46.7 cu in) triples based on the Street Triple RS 765.
 2019: Both Moto2 and Moto3 adopt the qualifying format used by MotoGP.
 2019: The MotoE class is introduced using electric motorcycles.
 2019: A new penalty named the "Long Lap" penalty is introduced for riders exceeding track limits during races and is also used as a penalty for moderate reckless riding.
 2019: Marc Márquez wins his sixth MotoGP title at the age of 26, becoming the youngest rider and the first non-Italian rider to do so.
 2019: Seven-time MotoGP champion Valentino Rossi becomes the first rider to contest his 400th Grand Prix at the age of 40.

2020s
 2020: The first half of the season is postponed or cancelled as a result of the COVID-19 pandemic.
 2020: Brad Binder and Miguel Oliveira become the first riders to win a premier class Grand Prix for their respective nations; South Africa and Portugal. They also achieved the first wins for KTM and Tech3 in the MotoGP class.
 2020: Suzuki wins the World Championship with Joan Mir for the first time since 2000.
 2021: Moto3 rider Jason Dupasquier died after an accident during the second qualifying session at the Italian Grand Prix.
 2021: Valentino Rossi, who confirmed his retirement before the 2021 Styrian round, will be the last 500cc - era rider to compete in MotoGP.
 2021: Fabio Quartararo became the 2021 World Champion, becoming the first French rider to win a premier class championship.
 2022: At the 2022 Italian motorcycle Grand Prix, Jorge Martín did 363 km/h or >1 hm/s, the new top speed record in the premier class.
 2022: Suzuki suspend their MotoGP participation at the end of the season.
 2022: Francesco Bagnaia became the 2022 World Champion, becoming the first Italian rider to win a premier class championship since Valentino Rossi in 2009.
 2023: MotoGP is set to visit 18 different countries with Kazakhstan and India the new additions, subject to homologation.

Event format
The starting grid is composed of three columns and contains approximately 20 riders. Grid positions are decided in descending order of qualifying speed, with the fastest on the pole or first position. Races last approximately 45 minutes, each race is a sprint from start to finish without pitting for fuel or tires.

In 2005, a flag-to-flag rule for MotoGP was introduced. Previously, if a race started dry and rain fell, officials could red-flag (stop) the race and either restart or resume on 'wet' tyres. Now, when rain falls, a white flag is shown, indicating that riders can pit to swap the motorcycle on which they started the race for an identical one, as long as the tyres are different (that is, intermediates or wets instead of slicks). Besides different tyres, the wet-weather bikes have steel brake rotors and different brake pads instead of the carbon discs and pads used on the 'dry' bikes. This is because the carbon brakes need to be very hot to function properly, and the water cools them too much. The suspension is also 'softened' up somewhat for the wet weather.

When a rider crashes, track marshals up the track from the incident wave yellow flags, prohibiting overtaking in that area; one corner farther up the track, a stationary yellow flag is shown. If a fallen rider cannot be evacuated safely from the track, the race is red-flagged. Motorcycle crashes are usually one of two types: lowside, when the bike loses either front or rear tire grip and slides out on the "low" side, and the more dangerous highside, when the tires do not completely slide out, but instead grip the track surface, flipping the bike over to the "high side", usually catapulting the rider over the top. Increased use of traction control has made highsides much less frequent.

Riders

Current 

(1) Test Rider, no Wildcard events scheduled.

(2) Replaced an injured rider

(3) Test Rider, has Wildcard events scheduled

Champions

The Riders' World Championship is awarded to the most successful rider over a season, as determined by a points system based on Grand Prix results.

Giacomo Agostini is the most successful champion in Grand Prix history, with 15 titles to his name (8 in the 500 cc class and 7 in the 350 cc class). The most dominant rider of all time was Mike Hailwood, winning 10 out of 12 (83%) races, in the 250 cc class, in the 1966 season. Mick Doohan, who won 12 out of 15 (80%) of the 500 cc races in the 1997 Grand Prix motorcycle racing season also deserves an honourable mention. Valentino Rossi is the most successful contemporary rider, having won nine titles including seven 500cc/MotoGP titles (2001–2005, 2008–2009), and one each at 250 cc and 125 cc levels. The current champion is Italian rider Francesco Bagnaia.

Circuits

The 2023 MotoGP season consists of 21 Grands Prix.

, Portimão, Algarve International Circuit
, Termas de Río Hondo, Autódromo Termas de Río Hondo
, Austin, Circuit of the Americas
, Jerez de la Frontera, Circuito de Jerez
, Le Mans, Circuit Bugatti
, Mugello, Autodromo Internazionale del Mugello
, Hohenstein-Ernstthal, Sachsenring
, Assen, TT Circuit Assen
, Almaty, Sokol International Racetrack,
, Spielberg bei Knittelfeld, Red Bull Ring
, Silverstone, Silverstone Circuit
, Montmeló, Circuit de Barcelona
, Misano Adriatico, Misano World Circuit Marco Simoncelli
, Greater Noida, Buddh International Circuit
, Motegi, Mobility Resort Motegi
, Central Lombok, Mandalika International Street Circuit
, Phillip Island, Phillip Island Grand Prix Circuit
, Buriram, Chang International Circuit
, Sepang, Sepang International Circuit
, Lusail, Losail International Circuit
, Cheste, Circuit Ricardo Tormo

Technical regulations
The following shows the key technical regulations for each class. It was also introduced for the 2005 year, that under rule 2.10.5: 'No fuel on the motorcycle may be more than 15 °C below ambient temperature. The use of any device on the motorcycle to artificially decrease the temperature of the fuel below ambient temperature is forbidden. No motorcycle may include such a device.' This stops an artificial "boost" gained from increasing fuel density by cooling it.

MotoGP class

At the beginning of the new MotoGP era in 2002, 500 cc two-stroke or 990 cc four-stroke bikes were specified to race. The enormous power advantage of the twice as large displacement four-stroke engine over the half the size two-stroke meant that by the following season, no two-stroke bikes were racing. In 2007, the maximum engine capacity was reduced to 800 cc without reducing the existing weight restriction.
 
MotoGP-class motorcycles are not restricted to any specific engine configuration. However, the number of cylinders employed in the engine determines the motorcycle's permitted minimum weight; the weight of the extra cylinders acts as a form of handicap. This is necessary because, for a given capacity, an engine with more cylinders is capable of producing more power. If comparable bore to stroke ratios are employed, an engine with more cylinders will have a greater piston area and a shorter stroke. The increased piston area permits an increase in the total valve area, allowing more air and fuel to be drawn into the engine, and the shorter stroke permits higher revs at the same piston speed, allowing the engine to pump still more air and fuel with the potential to produce more power, but with more fuel consumption too. In 2004 motorcycles were entered with three-, four-and five-cylinder configurations. A six-cylinder engine was proposed by Blata, but it did not reach the MotoGP grids. Presently four-cylinder engines appear to offer the best compromise between weight, power, and fuel consumption as all competitors in the 2009 series used this solution in either 'V' or in-line configuration.

In 2002, the FIM became concerned about the advances in design and engineering that resulted in higher speeds around the race track; regulation changes related to weight, amount of available fuel and engine capacity were introduced.

On 11 December 2009, the Grand Prix Commission announced that the MotoGP class would switch to the 1,000 cc motor limit starting in the 2012 season. Carmelo Ezpeleta, the CEO of Dorna Sports, indicated that the projected changes were received by the teams favorably.

From 2012, teams not entered by one of the major manufacturers could seek "claiming rule team" (CRT) status.  Claiming rule team were intended to allow independent teams to be competitive at a lower cost and increase the number of entries in MotoGP. Claiming rule teams benefitted from less restrictive rules on the number of engines that could be used in a season, and with larger fuel allowances during the races. Under the claiming rule, CRTs agree to allow up to four of their engines per season to be claimed, after a race, by one of the major manufacturer teams at a cost of €20,000 each including transmission, or €15,000 each for the engine alone. From the 2014 season, the CRT class was dropped in favour of an "Open Class" specification - allowing teams using the control ECU hardware and software certain benefits to increase their competitiveness.

From 2023, Ride height – or holeshot – devices will be banned. These devices have been common place in MotoGP since the back-end of 2018, when Ducati first introduced a system that could lower the rear of its bike to help with acceleration off the line for race starts.

Moto2 class

Moto2 was initially a 600 cc four-stroke class introduced in 2010 to replace the traditional 250 cc two-stroke class. Engines were supplied exclusively by Honda, tires by Dunlop and electronics are limited and supplied only by FIM-sanctioned producers. Carbon brake discs are banned, only steel brake discs are allowed. However, there are no chassis limitations. Until 2019, only 600 cc four-stroke Moto2 machines were allowed.

In 2019 Triumph replaced Honda as the sole supplier of Moto2 engines. The Triumph's engine configuration is 765 cc displacement with three cylinders, contrasting with the previous Honda's 600 cc in-line four.

Moto3 class 

The 125 cc class was replaced in 2012 by the Moto3 class. The minimum age for the Moto3 class normally is 16, and cannot be older than 28 years, or 25 years for new contracted riders participating for the first time and wild-cards. A change of rules was introduced in 2014, allowing under-age FIM CEV Repsol Moto3 (junior) champions to participate in a subsequent Moto3 series at World Championship level. The first beneficiary of this rule-change was double (2013 and 2014) CEV champion Fabio Quartararo.

MotoE class 

The MotoE World Cup was introduced in 2019 and features all-electric motorcycles. The series uses a spec Energica Ego Corsa motorcycle, manufactured by Energica Motor Company. The first season was contested over 6 rounds (at 4 Grand Prix weekends).

Powertrain specifications

Weights

 In 2006, fuel tank capacity was reduced slightly from 24 litres to 
 From 2007 onwards, and for a minimum period of five years, FIM has regulated in MotoGP class that two-stroke bikes will no longer be allowed. The maximum fuel capacity is to be .
From 2007 to 2011, engines were limited to 800 cc four-strokes
In 2012 engine displacement was increased to 1000cc
For the 2013 season minimum weight was increased to 
For the 2015 season minimum weight was decreased to

Tyres
Tyre selection is critical, usually done by the individual rider based on bike 'feel' during practice, qualifying and the pre-race warm-up laps on the morning of the race, as well as the predicted weather. The typical compromise is between grip and longevity—softer compound tyres have more traction, but wear out more quickly; harder compound tyres have less traction, but are more likely to last the entire race. Conserving rubber throughout a race is a specific skill winning riders acquire. Special 'Q' or qualifying tyres of extreme softness and grip were typically used during grid-qualifying sessions until their use was discontinued at the end of the 2008 season, but they lasted typically no longer than one or two laps, though they could deliver higher qualifying speeds. In wet conditions, special tires ('wets') with full treads are used, but they suffer extreme wear if the track dries out.

In 2007 new MotoGP regulations limited the number of tires any rider could use over the practice and qualifying period, and the race itself, to a maximum of 31 tyres (14 fronts and 17 rears) per rider. This introduced a problem of tire choice versus weather (among other factors) that challenges riders and teams to optimize their performance on race day. This factor was greeted with varying degrees of enthusiasm by participants. Bridgestone had dominated in 2007 and Michelin riders Valentino Rossi, Nicky Hayden, Dani Pedrosa, and Colin Edwards all acknowledged shortcomings in Michelin's race tires relative to Bridgestone. Rossi, disappointed with and critical of the performance of his Michelin tires, switched to Bridgestones for 2008 and won the world championship in dominant fashion. Pedrosa controversially switched to Bridgestones during the 2008 season.

In 2008, the rules were amended to allow more tires per race weekend—18 fronts and 22 rears for a total of 40 tires. The lower number of tires per weekend was considered a handicap to Michelin riders. The only MotoGP team using Dunlop tires in 2007, Yamaha Tech 3, did not use them in 2008 but switched to Michelin.

For 2009, 2010 and 2011, a 'spec' tyre supplier, Bridgestone, was appointed by the FIM (with Michelin no longer supplying any tyres to MotoGP and returning to the category in 2016). For the whole season Bridgestone provided four specifications of front tyre, six of rear, and a single wet specification—with no qualifying specification. For each round Bridgestone provided only two specifications for front and rear. Tyres are assigned to riders randomly to assure impartiality. Jorge Lorenzo has publicly supported the mono tyre rule.

At the end of the 2015 season, Bridgestone withdrew as tyre supplier of MotoGP. Following a formal tender, French tyre manufacturer Michelin became the official supplier for the 2016 season, marking their return to the series and testing began in Aragon immediately after the end of the 2015 season.

In media

Hitting the Apex, a documentary film about MotoGP, was released in 2015 and is now available on DVD.
Faster, a documentary film about MotoGP, was released in 2003 and is now available on DVD.
Fastest, a documentary film about MotoGP, was released in 2011 and is now available on DVD.
MotoGP Unlimited, a documentary film about MotoGP, was released in 2022.

Video games 
Early Grand Prix video games include Grand Prix 500 cc (1987), Cycles: International GP Racing (1989), Grand Prix 500 2 (1991) and GP-1 (1993). The first simulator was GP 500, launched in 1999. In the early 2000s, THQ published five video games for Windows and Xbox platforms, whereas Namco published five video games for PlayStation platforms. In 2007, Capcom became the new PlayStation publisher. In 2008, THQ lost the MotoGP licence and Capcom became the exclusive publisher.

MotoGP 2010, an iOS game made in 2010 by I-Play, released on 3 September 2010 and was not received well by critics after having a 43% rating on Metacritic. MotoGP 10/11 was released by Capcom on 15 March 2011, for the PlayStation 3 and Xbox 360. Metacritic gave the game a rating of 72%.

As of 2013, Milestone srl have had the license for MotoGP video games, a contract that will now last until at least 2026. 
The first game in this run of their contract was MotoGP 13, which was released on 21 June 2013 on PlayStation Vita, PlayStation 3, and Xbox 360. The game received mixed reviews and scored 73%.

See also

 Outline of motorcycles and motorcycling
 Grand Prix motorcycle racing sponsorship liveries
 List of MotoGP broadcasters

References

External links

 

 
Motorcycle road racing series
Fédération Internationale de Motocyclisme
World motorcycle racing series
1949 establishments in Europe